William Harry Hallman (March 15, 1876 – April 23, 1950) was an American professional baseball player.

Career 
As an outfielder, he played for three different teams in Major League Baseball; the Milwaukee Brewers in 1901, the Chicago White Sox in 1903, and the Pittsburgh Pirates in 1906 and 1907.  Additionally, he had a long minor league baseball career, beginning in 1894 and ending in 1914.

Death 
Hallman died at the age of 74 in his hometown of Philadelphia, Pennsylvania, and is interred at Mount Peace Cemetery.

Personal life 
He is the nephew of Bill Hallman, who also played baseball at the Major League level.

References

External links

1876 births
1950 deaths
Baseball players from Philadelphia
Major League Baseball outfielders
Milwaukee Brewers (1901) players
Chicago White Sox players
Pittsburgh Pirates players
Easton Dutchmen players
Philadelphia Colts players
Portsmouth Truckers players
Petersburg Farmers players
Hampton Clamdiggers players
Portsmouth Browns players
Bloomsburg Blue Jays players
Reading Actives players
Canandaigua Giants players
Newark Colts players
Utica Pentups players
Sioux City Cornhuskers players
Milwaukee Brewers (minor league) players
Louisville Colonels (minor league) players
Kansas City Blues (baseball) players
Toledo Mud Hens players
Indianapolis Indians players
Montgomery Rebels players
Bridgeport Crossmen players
Burials at Mount Peace Cemetery